Dungeons & Dragons: Honor Among Thieves is a 2023 American fantasy heist action comedy film directed by Jonathan Goldstein and John Francis Daley, who co-wrote the screenplay with Michael Gilio from a story by Chris McKay and Gilio. Based on the tabletop role-playing game Dungeons & Dragons, it is set in the Forgotten Realms campaign setting and has no connections to the film trilogy released between 2000 and 2012. The film stars Chris Pine, Michelle Rodriguez, Regé-Jean Page, Justice Smith, Sophia Lillis and Hugh Grant.

Production went through various phases in development since 2013, beginning with Warner Bros. Pictures after beating Hasbro and Universal Pictures in a lawsuit over the film rights to the tabletop role-playing game, before moving to Paramount Pictures, each with various writers and directors. Goldstein and Daley were the final writers/directors, using elements from the previous attempt by director Chris McKay and screenwriter Michael Gilio. Filming began in April 2021 in Iceland and later Northern Ireland.

Dungeons & Dragons: Honor Among Thieves had its world premiere at South by Southwest on March 10, 2023, and is scheduled to be released in the United States on March 31, 2023, by Paramount Pictures. The film received positive reviews from critics, with praise for Goldstein and Daley's direction and the film's humor and emotional weight, as well as its action sequences, visuals and cast performances.

Plot
Edgin Darvis spent years working as a member of the Harpers, until his wife was killed by a Red Wizard he had confronted on a mission. Accompanied by barbarian Holga Kilgore, Edgin attempted to make a new life for himself and his daughter Kira by turning to theft, forming a team with amateur sorcerer Simon Aumar and rogue Forge Fitzwilliam. One mission led to them infiltrating a former Harper stronghold to acquire a resurrection tablet that would have allowed Edgin to resurrect his wife, however, Forge's new acquaintance Sofina is revealed to be a Red Wizard who uses the break-in to steal something else from the stronghold. Simon and Forge are able to escape, but Edgin and Holga are captured. 

The two escape their prison two years later, learning that Forge has been acting as Kira's guardian and become the Lord of Neverwinter. Forge has been claiming that Edgin was captured because he just wanted to be rich rather than reveal the true reason for the break-in, the resurrection tablet for Kira's mother. When Forge attempts to have Edgin and Holga executed, they escape and decide to recruit a new team to break into Forge's vault and retrieve the resurrection tablet as proof that Edgin is telling the truth. They track down Simon to use his magic expertise, and Simon suggests Doric, a tiefling druid, as another member. 

Doric's animal shapeshifting allows the group to confirm the defenses around the vault, but Simon declares that he lacks the power to disable the complex enchantments. Recalling a tale of a relic retrieved by her people that would have such power, Holga leads them to an old graveyard that allows Simon to question the dead with a talisman. Confirming that the soldiers claimed the helm they seek in their last battle, the group trace the relic to Xenk Yandar, a paladin and survivor of the Thay after the Red Wizards destroyed their country.

Xenk guides the group to the underground city where he left the relic, which also leads to Simon receiving a Hither and Thither Staff allowing for short-range teleportation. With the helmet retrieved, Xenk departs, but Simon has trouble mastering the relic. Edgin suggests a new plan where they use the staff to teleport inside the vault and steal Forge's riches during the new Games he has re-opened. However, when they infiltrate the vault, it turns out to be empty, leading Edgin and the others to realize that Forge has been working with Sofina to cast an ancient ritual to turn those attending the games into her zombie slaves with a horn she stole in the original raid, while Forge escapes with the riches.

Edgin is able to escape execution by persuading Forge to put them in the games by playing on his ego, allowing the team to escape during the contest. Returning to the boat where Forge had moved his riches, Forge proves Edgin was telling the truth when he threatens Kira to convince Edgin to give up the boat, only for the group to steal the boat back. Witnessing Sofina begin her ritual leads Edgin to decide that they have to go back and save the people, using the teleportation staff to transport Forge's stolen riches out of the boat and spread across the city to draw people out of the stadium.

Outraged at her defeat, Sofina attacks the group, but in the process Simon is able to master his magic. Sofina's attempt to use a time-stop spell fails when Simon nullifies the spell, allowing Kira to use an invisibility pendant to place an anti-magic bracelet on Sofina so that the team can defeat her. Holga is revealed to have been fatally injured in the battle, but Edgin and Kira use the tablet to bring her back to life.

With the old Lord of Neverwinter restored, he declares the team heroes of the realm and Forge is sent to prison.

Cast
 Chris Pine as Edgin Darvis, a bard and former member of the Harpers. After his wife was murdered, he raised his daughter Kira with his friend Holga. In prison with Holga following a heist gone wrong, he plots their escape in hopes of being reunited with his daughter.
 Michelle Rodriguez as Holga Kilgore, a barbarian who was exiled from the Uthgardt Elk Tribe. She acts as a surrogate mother for Kira and is imprisoned with Edgin.
 Regé-Jean Page as Xenk Yendar, a paladin who narrowly escaped the lich Szass Tam's "rise to power" in Thay and as a result, "ages more slowly than a normal human".
 Rylan Jackson portrays young Xenk
 Justice Smith as Simon Aumar, a  wild magic sorcerer who is the descendent of Elminster Aumar, a notable wizard.
 Sophia Lillis as Doric, a tiefling druid raised in the Neverwinter Wood by a wood elf enclave. She is a member of the Emerald Enclave and has organized a resistance against the Lord of Neverwinter who targeted the forest "for its resources".
 Hugh Grant as Forge Fitzwilliam, an ambitious rogue and con artist. He is a former member of Edgin's crew and has been taking care of Kira. Since Edgin's imprisonment, he's become the Lord of Neverwinter, gained great wealth and received counsel from Sofina.
 Daisy Head as Sofina, a Red Wizard of Thay with a focus in necromancy and "ties to Thay's tyrannical magocracy".
 Jason Wong as Dralas, a Red Wizard of Thay
 Chloe Coleman as Kira Darvis, Edgin's daughter who has fallen under the sway of Forge, her guardian for two years following her father's imprisonment.

Comedy group Aunty Donna provided voices for corpses for the Australian release of the film. Additionally, cast members from the Dungeons & Dragons web series Critical Role made cameo appearances in the film.

Production

Development
On May 7, 2013, Warner Bros. Pictures and Courtney Solomon's Sweetpea Entertainment announced a film based on Dungeons & Dragons with David Leslie Johnson-McGoldrick writing the script and Roy Lee, Alan Zeman, and Solomon producing. Two days later, Hasbro issued a lawsuit saying that they were co-producing a Dungeons & Dragons film at Universal Pictures with Chris Morgan writing and directing. On August 3, 2015, after U.S. District Judge Dolly Gee urged Sweetpea Entertainment and Hasbro to settle the film rights case, the Warner Bros. film was set for pre-production with Hasbro. On March 31, 2016, Rob Letterman was in negotiations to direct Johnson-McGoldrick's script, with his role confirmed on May 13, 2016. In April 2017, actor Joe Manganiello, an avid fan of Dungeons & Dragons, revealed that he had written a script with John Cassel for the project and was "talking to all the right parties" to make the film happen. Upon completing the script, Manganiello worked in collaboration with Brad Peyton and Dwayne Johnson, who were both in negotiations to develop the film.

In December 2017, after varying degrees of progression, the film was moved by Hasbro to Paramount Pictures and was scheduled for a release date of July 23, 2021. In February 2018, Paramount was in talks with both Chris McKay and Michael Gilio to direct and write the film, respectively. In March 2019, it was revealed that Gilio had completed a first draft and studio executives expressed excitement for the film. The studio began negotiations with various talent, as the casting process began. On July 30, 2019, Jonathan Goldstein and John Francis Daley were in talks to direct. Goldstein and Daley began meeting with Paramount following Daley talking about his career with a literary agent at a sports bar in Sherman Oaks during a game between the Chicago Cubs, which Daley is a fan of, and the Los Angeles Dodgers. After saying to the agent that he and Goldstein had left directing duties on The Flash, the agent asked if they were looking for work. The agent tipped off Paramount, who presented Goldstein and Daley with the script for Dungeons & Dragons.

Writing 
By January 2020, Goldstein and Daley announced that they had co-written a new draft of the script. Ultimately, Daley, Goldstein, and Gilio received screenplay credit, while McKay and Gilio received story credit. Goldstein stated that "ours is a movie that doesn't take itself with great seriousness, but it's never a spoof. It honors the world of D&D and celebrates it but, hopefully, it gives the audience an engaging and fun ride". Daley commented that the film's influences include The Princess Bride, Monty Python and the Holy Grail, The Lord of the Rings and Indiana Jones with the Indiana Jones structure evocating both a "dungeon crawl" and the heist film genre that they wanted to draw on. Daley highlighted that the heist genre is familiar to the audience which provides the framework for the "uninitiated" so that "they understand what our characters are setting out to do without being overwhelmed by lore or proper nouns". Daley also wanted the film to be accessible for those unfamiliar with the fantasy genre. The Austin Chronicle highlighted "since the basis of most tabletop campaigns is a group of strangers coming together to complete a job, the thematic parallels between heist movies and fantasy roleplaying campaigns offer a shared language for newcomers".

Goldstein commented that they use the sorcerer character in the film to address why magic can't "solve all problems" – "it makes storytelling nearly impossible if you can solve any problem with a magical spell". Goldstein stated that when discussing the visual presentation of the film with Daley that they decided they didn't want "two people standing there with their hands out and rays coming out of their hands". As a result, the film pulls directly from the magic system of Dungeons & Dragons with magic users "combining physical components and verbal spellcasting to show a variety of magical effects onscreen". Justice Smith, who plays the sorcerer, commented that he worked with the choreographer "to create unique gestures for each spell" with many of the spells incorporating actual sign language into the gestures.

Casting
On June 27, 2016, Ansel Elgort was in talks to star in Letterman's iteration of the film. In December 2020, Chris Pine was cast to star in the film. Michelle Rodriguez, Justice Smith, and Regé-Jean Page were added in February 2021. Hugh Grant and Sophia Lillis would join the next month, with Grant cast as the antagonist. In April, Chloe Coleman joined the ensemble cast.  In May, Jason Wong and Daisy Head joined the cast. In July 2022, at a panel at San Diego Comic Con, it was revealed that cast members from the Dungeons & Dragons web series Critical Role would make cameo appearances in the film.

Filming
Filming began in early April 2021, with a crew of 60-70 people in Iceland. Principal photography commenced in Belfast, Northern Ireland later that month. Goldstein stated that when the cast arrived in Ireland they "played a several-hours-long game of D&D" with the actors role-playing as their film characters which "gave those who were not familiar with [D&D] a quick taste of what the game is like and how you interact". This game "also informed the directors' takes on the characters" with Goldstein commenting that "I think we incorporated some of the things we learned from that game into the film". 

On August 19, 2021, Daley announced that filming had completed.

Music 
Lorne Balfe scored the film; Balfe stated "I used to play Dungeons, so when I heard they were making that, I knew I wanted to be part of the team". In March 2023, Tame Impala released the single "Wings Of Time" for film. Marisa Mirabal, for IndieWire, wrote that "Balfe heightens the tension with a unique mixture of verbal chanting and rhythmic beats that properly enhance the meticulous stuntwork. The score morphs into a creature of its own and is unlike the soothing, sweeping scores of other fantasy films. Balfe also successfully leans into the bard lore of Pine's character by composing songs that are light-hearted, poetic, and heavy with string instruments".

Release
Dungeons & Dragons: Honor Among Thieves had its world premiere at the South by Southwest film festival on March 10, 2023, and will be theatrically released in the United States on March 31, by Paramount Pictures. Paramount will handle worldwide distribution for the film, except for theatrical rights in Canada and the United Kingdom, which will be handled by Entertainment One. The film is also scheduled to have several promotional advanced screenings before the theatrical release.

The film was originally set to be released on July 23, 2021. The release date subsequently shifted to November 19, 2021, to accommodate the release of Mission: Impossible – Dead Reckoning Part One, before being pushed back further to May 27, 2022, due to the COVID-19 pandemic. In April 2021, the release date was further delayed to March 3, 2023. On April 21, 2022, the official title of the film was announced as Dungeons & Dragons: Honor Among Thieves. In November 2022, the film's release was once again pushed back to March 31, 2023.

Marketing

Promotion 
In July 2022, Honor Among Thieves was featured at San Diego Comic-Con (SDCC); this included a panel with members of the cast and crew and a "Tavern Experience". The "Tavern Experience" showcased characters of the film. A teaser trailer was released on July 21, 2022, on the same date as the film's SDCC panel. Its soundtrack has excerpts from Led Zeppelin's "Whole Lotta Love". The "Tavern Experience" was then featured at CCXP in December 2022 and showcased various monsters from Dungeons & Dragons. A TV spot for the film was expected to air during Super Bowl LVII; this promotion was released online before the game.

Tie-in literature and merchandise 
A prequel publishing campaign following various of the film's characters began in February 2023 before the release of Honor Among Thieves. Doric is the main character in the young adult novel The Druid's Call (2023) by E.K. Johnston, and The Road to Neverwinter (2023) adult novel by Jaleigh Johnson focuses on Edgin Darvis. Dungeons & Dragons: Honor Among Thieves—The Feast of the Moon is a 96-page prequel graphic novel which focuses on Edgin and his band of thieves with a back-up story focused on Xenk and the Helmet of Disjunction. It was written by Jeremy Lambert and Ellen Boener and drawn by Eduardo Ferigato and Guillermo Sanna.

The Dungeons & Dragons adventure anthology Keys From the Golden Vault (2023) features a heist set in Revel's End – a maximum-security prison location created for the movie which is located in the fictional Icewind Dale. While created for the movie, it first appeared in the adventure module Icewind Dale: Rime of the Frostmaiden (2020). Wizards of the Coast also released playable Dungeons & Dragons stat blocks for the film's main characters as a free promotion on D&D Beyond.

Reception 

  

After the premiere at South by Southwest, A.A. Dowd at Chron noted that "the reaction at the Paramount Theatre last night suggests that this could be a bigger hit than plenty have predicted, if word of its canny exploitation of the Marvel model travels fast and far."

Future
In February 2022, a spin-off television series was announced to be in development. A part of a "multi-pronged approach" for television projects, the show is described as the "flagship" and "cornerstone" live-action series, of the multiple projects in development; while the series will "complement" the film side of the franchise. Rawson Marshall Thurber is set to serve as creator, writer, executive producer, and showrunner for the series, in addition to directing the pilot episode. Various networks and streaming companies bid on distribution rights. In January 2023, it was announced that Paramount+ gave the show a straight to series order and will consist of eight episodes, with Entertainment One and Paramount Pictures serving as production companies.

Notes

References

External links
 
  
 

2020s American films
2020s English-language films
2020s fantasy adventure films
2023 action adventure films
2023 action comedy films
2023 fantasy films
2023 films
American action adventure films
American fantasy adventure films
Canadian action adventure films
Canadian fantasy adventure films
Dungeons & Dragons films
English-language Canadian films
Entertainment One films
Films about dragons
Films based on role-playing games
Films directed by Jonathan Goldstein and John Francis Daley
Films postponed due to the COVID-19 pandemic
Films scored by Lorne Balfe
Films shot in Iceland
Films shot in Northern Ireland
Hasbro Studios films
High fantasy films
Paramount Pictures films
Reboot films